Autocharis ecthaemata is a moth in the family Crambidae. It was described by George Hampson in 1913. It is found in Ethiopia, Kenya, Madagascar and on Aldabra atoll in the Seychelles.

References

Moths described in 1913
Odontiinae
Moths of Africa